"Both" is a song by American rapper Gucci Mane featuring Canadian rapper Drake, released as the third single from the former's tenth studio album The Return of East Atlanta Santa.(2016) The song was written by  the artists alongside producers Metro Boomin and Southside. This songs marks their second collaboration following the 2016 song "Back on Road".

Release
On December 15, 2016, Gucci Mane teased the third single for the album, called "Both". The song features guest vocals from Drake, with production by Metro Boomin and Southside. It was then sent to urban radio January 31, 2017, as the third official single.

Remix 
On April 13, 2017, an official remix featuring an additional verse from Lil Wayne was released.

Chart performance
"Both" debuted at number 41 on the Billboard Hot 100 and would go on to chart for 22 weeks. It became Gucci Mane's longest-charting single as lead artist on the charts, behind "Black Beatles", which is his biggest hit overall. It also peaked at number 43 on the Canadian Hot 100 and number 16 on the Hot R&B/Hip-Hop Songs chart. Drake's contribution earned him his 132nd chart entry, tying Lil Wayne's record for the most chart entries. The song also peaked at number one on the Billboard urban airplay chart, becoming Gucci Mane's first number one single and Drake's 21st number one on that chart.

Charts

Weekly charts

Year-end charts

Certifications

References

External links

2016 singles
Gucci Mane songs
Drake (musician) songs
Songs written by Gucci Mane
Songs written by Drake (musician)
Song recordings produced by Metro Boomin
Songs written by Southside (record producer)
Songs written by Metro Boomin
2016 songs
Trap music songs
Song recordings produced by Southside (record producer)